Herve Antchandie (born 24 September 2001) is a Gabonese tennis player.

Antchandie has a career high ATP singles ranking of 1,425, achieved on 22 December 2014. He also has a career high ATP doubles ranking of 1,873, which was achieved on 16 September 2019.

Antchandie has represented Gabon at Davis Cup, where he has a win-loss record of 1–2.

Davis Cup

Participations: (1–2)

   indicates the outcome of the Davis Cup match followed by the score, date, place of event, the zonal classification and its phase, and the court surface.

References

External links 
 
 
 

1995 births
Living people
Gabonese sportsmen
Competitors at the 2019 African Games
French male tennis players
African Games competitors for Gabon
21st-century Gabonese people